Stephen Christopher Smiley (born April 1, 1981) is an American basketball coach who is the current head coach of the Northern Colorado Bears men's basketball team.

Playing career
Smiley was a two-time all-state selection from Pomona High School in Arvada, Colorado. Smiley played collegiately under Don Meyer at Northern State. He completed his career with the Wolves as the school's record holder in assists with 537, while also ranking third all-time in single-season field goal percentage, along with being named a NSIC all-conference performer his senior year.

Coaching career
Smiley's coaching career began in 2005 as an assistant at then-NAIA institution Black Hills State under Paul Sather for one season before returning to his alma mater as an assistant coach from 2006 to 2008. Smiley was then named the head coach at Sheridan College in Wyoming, a NJCAA school. From 2008 to 2014 he led the Generals to a 153-43 overall record with four North Sub-Region 9 titles and two runner-up finishes. They advanced to four Region 9 Final Fours along with two appearances in the championship game. Smiley would join the Division I ranks in 2014 by accepting a position on Randy Rahe's staff at Weber State and was part of the team's 2016 Big Sky championship team which made an appearance in the 2016 NCAA tournament. The following season he moved to Big Sky rival Northern Colorado as an assistant coach under Jeff Linder. In the four seasons with the Bears as an assistant, the team posted three-straight 20-win seasons, and won the 2018 CIT. On March 20, 2020, three days after Linder departed to take the head coaching position at Wyoming, Smiley was elevated to head coach, becoming the 20th coach in Northern Colorado history.

Head coaching record

NJCAA

NCAA D1

References

External links

1981 births
Living people
American men's basketball coaches
Basketball coaches from Colorado
Northern Colorado Bears men's basketball coaches
Weber State Wildcats men's basketball coaches
Northern State Wolves men's basketball coaches
Black Hills State Yellow Jackets men's basketball coaches
Sheridan Generals men's basketball coaches
Sportspeople from the Denver metropolitan area
Northern State Wolves men's basketball players
Basketball players from Colorado
People from Arvada, Colorado